In enzymology, a L-lysine-lactamase is an enzyme that catalyzes the chemical reaction

L-lysine 1,6-lactam + H2O  L-lysine

Thus, the two substrates of this enzyme are L-lysine 1,6-lactam and H2O, whereas its product is L-lysine.

This enzyme belongs to the family of hydrolases, those acting on carbon-nitrogen bonds other than peptide bonds, specifically in cyclic amides.  The systematic name of this enzyme class is L-lysine-1,6-lactam lactamhydrolase. Other names in common use include L-alpha-aminocaprolactam hydrolase, and L-lysinamidase.

References

 
 

EC 3.5.2
Enzymes of unknown structure